This list of earthquakes in Greece includes notable earthquakes that have affected Greece during recorded history. This list is currently incomplete, representing only a fraction of the possible events.

Tectonic setting
Greece is located at the complex boundary zone in the eastern Mediterranean between the African Plate and the Eurasian Plate. The northern part of Greece lies on the Eurasian Plate while the southern part lies on the Aegean Sea Plate. The Aegean Sea Plate is moving southwestward with respect to the Eurasian Plate at about 30 mm/yr while the African Plate is subducting northwards beneath the Aegean Sea Plate at a rate of about 40 mm/yr. The northern plate boundary is a relatively diffuse divergent boundary while the southern convergent boundary forms the Hellenic arc.

These two plate boundaries give rise to two contrasting tectonic styles, extension on east–west trending fault zones with strike-slip tectonics on SW-NE trending fault zones throughout west and central Greece, Peloponnese and the northern Aegean and contractional in the southern Aegean, continuing around to the Ionian islands. The south Aegean is the location of the volcanic arc and is characterised by extension. To the east of Crete along the Hellenic Arc, strike-slip tectonics with some extension become important.

The strongest earthquakes historically are those associated with the Hellenic Arc, although none larger than about 7.2 have been observed instrumentally. The events of AD 365 and 1303 are likely to have been much larger than this. In mainland Greece, normal faulting gives earthquakes up to 7 in magnitude, while in the northern Aegean, strike-slip events with a magnitude of 7.2 have been recorded. Large intermediate depth (>50 km) earthquakes of magnitude >7 from within the subducting African Plate have been recorded but such events cause little damage, although they are widely felt.

Earthquakes

See also
Geology of Greece

References

Sources

Greece
Earthquakes

Earthquakes